

People
 Mićo Janić (born 1979), Croatian sprint canoer
 Mićo Ljubibratić (1839–1889), Serbian revolutionary
 Mico Palanca (1978–2019), Filipino actor
 Mićo Smiljanić (born 1974), Serbian/Montenegrin footballer
 Mićo Stanišić (born 1954), Bosnian Serb politician
 Mićo Vranješ (born 1975), Serbian footballer
 Mieko Hirota (born 1947), Japanese singer
 Mitso Asen of Bulgaria (fl. 1256–1278),  Bulgarian tsar
 Irma Mico (1914–2022), French resistance fighter
 Richard Mico (1590–1661), English composer

Other uses
 MICO (Motor Industries Company), former name for Bosch India
 Mico (band), Canadian rock band
 Mico (genus), genus of monkey
 Mico, Texas
 Mico University College, Jamaica

See also
Miko (disambiguation)